David A. McDermut (about 1820 – April 18, 1863) was an officer in the Union Navy during the American Civil War.

A native of New York, McDermut was appointed midshipman on November 8, 1841, and attained the rank of lieutenant commander on July 16, 1862. During the Civil War, he served in Potomac and Marion before assuming command of Cayuga on December 2, 1862. He commanded Cayuga until April 18, 1863, when he was killed in action against Confederate forces near Sabine Pass.

Namesakes
Two ships have been named USS McDermut for him.

References

1820s births
1863 deaths
Union Navy officers
People of New York (state) in the American Civil War
Union military personnel killed in the American Civil War